Villabé is a commune in the Essonne department in Île-de-France in northern France.

Population
Inhabitants of Villabé are known as Villabéens in French.

See also
Communes of the Essonne department

References

External links

Official website 
Mayors of Essonne Association 

Communes of Essonne